Mu-young is a Korean unisex given name. The meaning differs based on the hanja used to write each syllable of the name. There are 21 hanja with the reading "mu" and 32 hanja with the reading "young" on the South Korean government's official list of hanja which may be used in given names.

People with this name include:
Moo-Young Han (born 1934), South Korean professor of physics at Duke University
Mu-Young Kim (born 1985), South Korean baseball pitcher
Kim Moo-young (born 1986), legal name since 2014 of Juno (singer), South Korean singer

Fictional characters with this name include:
Mu-young, in 2012 South Korean television series Arang and the Magistrate
Park Mu-young, in 1999 South Korean film Shiri

See also
List of Korean given names

References

Korean unisex given names